
Mickey is a household gloss on canvas painting by Damien Hirst executed in 2012. Hirst was invited by Disney to create an artwork inspired by Mickey Mouse and this was his response. The work was auctioned at Christie's, London, on 13 February 2014 in aid of Kids Company, a charity Hirst has long supported, fetching £902,500.

The auction lot notes quote Hirst as commenting:

References

External links

2012 paintings
English contemporary works of art
20th-century portraits
Works by Damien Hirst
Mickey Mouse in art